Pascoag  is a census-designated place (CDP) and village in Providence County, Rhode Island. The population was 4,577 at the 2010 census. Pascoag is one of eight villages that make up the town of Burrillville.

Geography
Pascoag is located at  (41.957401, -71.705957). The village is centered on the Pascoag River at its outlet from the Pascoag Reservoir.  The river drops  through the village, providing ample power for industry in the village's early days. According to the United States Census Bureau, the village has a total area of 5.5 square miles; 5 square miles is land and 0.4 square miles (7.88%) is water.

Demographics

As of the census of 2000, there were 4,742 people, 1,642 households, and 1,175 families residing in the village. The racial makeup was 98.33% White, 0.36% African American, 0.32% American Indian, 0.27% Asian, 0.02% Pacific Islander, 0.17% from other races, and 0.53% from two or more races. Hispanic or Latino of any race were 1.03% of the population. The population was spread out, with 26.5% under the age of 18, 7.4% from 18 to 24, 31.0% from 25 to 44, 19.7% from 45 to 64, and 15.4% who were 65 years of age or older. The median age was 37 years. The median income for a household was $48,778, and the median income for a family was $54,391.

History
The name of Burrillville's principal village, Pascoag, named after the stream upon which it is located, probably derives from an Algonquian Indian root. The Nipmuc word for snake was rendered "askug" by Roger Williams in his A Key Into the Language of America, and "askoog" by the Reverend John Eliot in his Algonquian translation of the Bible.
 
Pascoag can trace its origins back to the first half of the 18th century, when a saw mill and other businesses were built in what is now the village center.  In the 19th century, Pascoag became a textile manufacturing town, an industry that continued until after World War II. From 1891 until the 1930s the Woonsocket and Pascoag Railroad operated trains to Pascoag, but the line (currently operated by the Providence & Worcester Railroad) now terminates in Slatersville.

The horror author HP Lovecraft set part of his story "The Horror at Red Hook" (1925) in Pascoag.

Recent history includes an incident involving groundwater contamination. A test of the groundwater conducted on September 14, 2001, showed that the water contained the ether MTBE (methyl tertiary-butyl ether) at levels of over 350 ppb (parts per billion). This was the first public statement concerning the presence of MTBE in Pascoag drinking water, though residents claim to have detected it as early as May 2001. MTBE is a gasoline additive intended to enhance octane levels. It is believed to have come from leaking tanks at a local ExxonMobil gas station. As the situation was resolved over the following months, nearly 1,500 residents of Pascoag responded by filing a lawsuit against ExxonMobil through the law offices of Napoli, Kaiser, and Bern and Houston attorney Armistead Easterby. ExxonMobil signed off on a $7 million settlement with residents of Pascoag in May 2012, to cover the cost of having the Pascoag Public Utility District bore new wells.

Historic sites
 Pascoag Grammar School (1917)

References

External links
History of Pascoag
Pascoag Public Library
Pascoag Utility District
Pascoag Riverwalk, at Town of Burrillville website
 The Pascoag Cafe

Census-designated places in Providence County, Rhode Island
Villages in Providence County, Rhode Island
Burrillville, Rhode Island
Providence metropolitan area
Villages in Rhode Island
Census-designated places in Rhode Island